Elspe may refer to:

 Elspe (Lennestadt), a place in Sauerland, part of Lennestadt, Germany
 Elspe (Lenne), a right tributary of the Lenne river, in Sauerland
 Elspe (Volme), a right tributary of the Volme river, also in Sauerland